Brigadier Eric Leslie Booth,  (April 21, 1904 – August 14, 1944) was a Canadian Army officer.

Biography 
Born in Lancaster, England, Leslie Booth was the son of John William Booth and Rose Elizabeth Booth. His father was a veteran of the First World War.

Booth was married to Mary Helen Booth of Penetanguishene, Ontario.

Joining the Canadian Militia in the peacetime years, Booth was an officer with The Mississauga Horse of Toronto and later the 2nd/10th Dragoons of Hamilton until the outbreak of war in 1939. Joining the 1st Hussars of London, he proceeded overseas where later he was attached to the British Army's 17th Lancers as the regiment's second-in-command and served in the North African Campaign under General Montgomery.

Rejoining the Canadian Army again in time for the Allied Invasion of Sicily, Booth was promoted to Lieutenant Colonel and given command of the 12th Armoured Regiment (Three Rivers Regiment). During the campaign he received the Distinguished Service Order. Booth would later receive a Bar to his DSO while commanding the regiment at the Battle of Ortona when while disregarding danger from sniper, shell and mortar fire, he went forward for reconnaissance and to direct and encourage the men of his regiment.

In 1944, Booth was recalled from Italy and given command of the 4th Canadian Armoured Brigade. During operations in Normandy on August 8, 1944, Major General George Kitching, unable to reach Booth by radio, found him drunk in his tank. Kitching severely reprimanded Booth, but did not remove him.

Booth was killed on August 14, when his tank was hit by German artillery during Operation Tractable. Brigadier Booth is buried at the Bretteville-sur-Laize Canadian War Cemetery.

References 

Canadian Army Officers 1939−1945
Generals of World War II
https://www.cwgc.org/find-records/find-war-dead/casualty-details/2331643/booth,-eric-leslie/

1904 births
1944 deaths
Canadian Companions of the Distinguished Service Order
Canadian Militia officers
Canadian Army officers
Canadian Army personnel of World War II
People from Lancaster, Lancashire
Canadian military personnel killed in World War II
English emigrants to Canada
Military personnel from Lancashire